WBMF is a Christian radio station licensed to Crete, Illinois, broadcasting on 88.1 MHz FM. WBMF is owned and operated by Family Worship Center Church, Inc. The station began broadcasting in 2002. It was originally owned by the American Family Association and was an affiliate of American Family Radio. In 2004, the station was sold to Family Worship Center Church, along with WAWF and WWGN, for $1 million.

References

External links

BMF
Radio stations established in 2002
2002 establishments in Illinois